is a women's football team which plays in Japan's Nadeshiko League Division 1. It founded the league in 1990. From the 2019 season, the club has adopted the new name as "Speranza Osaka-Takatsuki".

Squad

Current squad
As of 2 May 2022.

Honors

Domestic competitions
Nadeshiko.League Division 1
Champions (1) : 1994
Nadeshiko League Cup
Runners-up (1) : 1998

Results

Transition of team name
Osaka-Takatsuki Ladies SC : 1990
Matsushita Electric Ladies SC Bambina : 1991 - 1994
Matsushita Electric Panasonic Bambina : 1995 - 1999
Speranza FC Takatsuki : 2000 - 2011
Speranza FC Osaka-Takatsuki : 2012 – 2015
Konomiya Speranza Osaka-Takatsuki : 2016 – 2018
Speranza Osaka-Takatsuki : 2019 – Present

References

External links 
 Speranza Osaka-Takatsuki official site
 Japanese Club Teams

Women's football clubs in Japan
1976 establishments in Japan
Gamba Osaka
Japan Women's Football League teams
Football clubs in Osaka Prefecture
Association football clubs established in 1976